Neverwas is a 2005 Canadian-American fantasy drama film, written and directed by Joshua Michael Stern in his directorial debut. It stars Ian McKellen, Aaron Eckhart, Brittany Murphy, Nick Nolte, William Hurt, and Jessica Lange. It was first shown at the 2005 Toronto International Film Festival. However, the film was never given a full theatrical release, eventually being released straight to DVD in 2007.

Plot
Zach Riley (Aaron Eckhart) is a psychiatrist who leaves a job at a prestigious university to take up a position at the privately run mental institution, Millwood, belonging to Dr. Reed (William Hurt). What he doesn't reveal at the time of his appointment is that this was the very place where his novelist father, T.L. Pierson (Nick Nolte), spent many years of his life as he battled chronic depression. T.L. later wrote a popular children's classic, Neverwas, about a child (based on young Zach himself) who enters a secret world to free a captive king. T.L. later committed suicide; Riley, who found the body, has always partly blamed himself for his father's death.

Riley is assigned to work with a schizophrenic patient, Gabriel Finch (Ian McKellen), and soon realizes that Finch sees himself as the captive king. As he listens to Finch and resumes his acquaintance with childhood friend Maggie Paige (Brittany Murphy) he realizes that more things link him to the book – and also to Finch's recovery – than he ever thought. T.L.'s novel was based on Finch's stories, told to him by Finch while both were patients in the hospital. Finch believes that the book is a sort of oracle confirming his personal reality, and that Riley is the boy hero. Riley comes to see himself this way in a sense, as he discovers that Finch's "hallucination" concerns actual places and events.

Cast
 Ian McKellen as Gabriel Finch
 Aaron Eckhart as Zach Riley
 Brittany Murphy as Maggie Paige
 Nick Nolte as T.L. Pierson
 Jessica Lange as Katherine Pierson
 William Hurt as Dr. Peter Reed
 Alan Cumming as Jake
 Vera Farmiga as Eleanna
 Bill Bellamy as Martin Sands
 Michael Moriarty as Dick
 Jen Taylor as Stagehand (uncredited)

Production

Development
The film was written and directed by filmmaker Joshua Michael Stern in his directorial debut. It was produced by Sidney Kimmel and Greg Shapiro, and co-produced by Aaron Eckhart who starred in the leading role. The film was distributed by Neverwas Productions and premiered at the Toronto International Film Festival on September 9, 2005. It was distributed by Miramax Home Entertainment for its home media release. Owing to the theme of a fairy tale which is based on real events, the film has often been compared with Finding Neverland (2004).

Filming
Principal photography took place in September 2004 in Vancouver, British Columbia, Canada.

References

External links
 
 
 
 Neverwas pre-production art
 Neverwas set photography

2005 films
2005 fantasy films
American fantasy films
Canadian fantasy films
English-language Canadian films
2000s English-language films
Films directed by Joshua Michael Stern
Films produced by Sidney Kimmel
Films scored by Philip Glass
Films shot in Vancouver
Miramax films
Sidney Kimmel Entertainment films
2005 directorial debut films
2000s American films
2000s Canadian films